INS Kalvari (S23) was the lead vessel of the  of diesel-electric submarines of the Indian Navy. It was the first ever submarine inducted into service by the Indian Navy. The submarine was laid down on 27 December 1966 as  B-51 of the Soviet Navy by Novo-Admiralty at Galerniy Island, Leningrad.

Overview
The submarine was launched on 15 April 1967 and competed on 26 September 1967. The submarine was commissioned by the Indian Navy on 8 December 1967 at Riga, Soviet Union. The Navy celebrates Submarine Day annually on 8 December to commemorate this occasion. The submarine was decommissioned in 1992.

Kalvari is the Malayalam word for tiger shark, a deep-sea predator in the Indian Ocean. The name symbolizes agility, strength and predatory power. The tiger shark (Galeocerdo Cuvier) is a species of requiem shark which are found in tropical and temperate waters.

References

Foxtrot-class submarines
Ships built in the Soviet Union
Ships built in Saint Petersburg
1967 ships
Kalvari-class submarines